The Omaha Airport Authority is the organization charged with management of Omaha Eppley Airfield and Millard Airport in Omaha, Nebraska.   It is overseen by a five-person Board of Directors, members of which are appointed by the Mayor of Omaha.

Airport Police

The airport authority has its own police department.  The department is independent from, but co-jurisdictional with the Omaha Police Department. As of October 2020, the Chief is Tim Conahan.

References

External links 
 

Airport operators of the United States
Organizations based in Omaha, Nebraska
Transportation in Omaha, Nebraska
1959 establishments in Nebraska
Government of Omaha, Nebraska